is a sound effects company working in the television, movie, radio, video, CD, cassette and video game animation industry in Japan.

Company history

Employees

Executive
Representative Director: Toru Noguchi (野口 透)

Staff
Toru Noguchi (野口 透)
Tsutomu Sukigara (鋤柄 務)

Former staff

Shoji Kato (加藤昭二)
Hiroshi Inoue (井上 裕)
Masato Kai (甲斐 雅人)
Rie Komiya (古宮 理恵) (freelance)
Kiyoshi Matsuda (松田 清)
Shinji Kazama (風間 慎二)
Kenichi Mori (森 賢一) (formerly of Fizz Sound Creation)
Junichi Sasaki (佐々木 純一) (freelance)

Works
(Listed in alphabetic order)

Principal productions

B-Daman series
El Hazard series
Eyeshield 21
Fushigi Yuugi series
Irresponsible Captain Tylor series
Tomato-Man and the Knights of the Salad Table
Kare Kano
Neon Genesis Evangelion series
Ninku
Oh My Goddess! (OVA)
Tenchi Muyo! series
Trouble Chocolate
Vampire Princess Miyu series
Yu-Gi-Oh! Duel Monsters
Yu-Gi-Oh! Duel Monsters GX
Yu Yu Hakusho series
Full Moon o Sagashite
Magical Princess Minky Momo series
Mermaid Melody Pichi Pichi Pitch series
Onegai My Melody series
Hamtaro series
Ultra Maniac
Mirmo!
Akubi-chan series
Shimajiro series (w/Daisuke Jinbo)

Freelance productions
This list contains some of the productions in which individual employees of Anime Sound took part, but for which the company itself was not hired. Any productions which are listed in the Principal production list are not repeated here.

Shoji Kato

Moonlight Mask
Gatchaman II
Gatchaman F
Ikki Tousen
Alice SOS
Dirty Pair
Full Moon o Sagashite
AIKa R-16: Virgin Mission
Animal Yokochō
Twin Spica
Ninku
Chi's Sweet Home
Gon, the Little Fox
Like the Clouds, Like the Wind
The Story of Saiunkoku
Kaitei Daisensou: Ai no 20.000 Miles
Eyeshield 21 series
Scan2Go 
House of Five Leaves
Tokimeki Tonight
Kobo-chan
Junk Boy
Iga no Kabamaru
Lament of the Lamb
Tensai Bakabon
The Place Promised in Our Early Days
Yu Yu Hakusho series
Fushigi Yuugi (OVA 3)
Kobo, the Li'l Rascal
My Big Big Friend
In This Corner of the World
Time Patrol Bon
Mad Bull 34
Harlock Saga
I Shall Never Return
Touch
5 Centimeters Per Second
Osomatsu-kun
Yoroshiku Mechadock
Okawari-Boy Starzan S
Anime Ganbare Goemon
Super Doll Licca-chan
Princess Comet
Magical Princess Minky Momo series

Junichi Sasaki

Creamy Mami, the Magic Angel
Persia, the Magic Fairy
Magical Emi, the Magic Star
Pastel Yumi, the Magic Idol
Fancy Lala
Magical Angel Sweet Mint
Anmitsu Hime
Idol Angel Yokoso Yoko
Idol Fighter Su-Chi-Pai
Jankenman
Floral Magician Mary Bell
Shimajiro series (w/Daisuke Jinbo)
Tomato-Man and the Knights of the Salad Table
Tenchi Muyo! series
Oh My Goddess! (OVA)
Moldiver
Gokudo
Trouble Chocolate
Angel Heart
Vampire Princess Miyu series
Violence Jack
Baketsu de Gohan
Princess Minerva
Hikari no Densetsu
Comic Party
Can Can Bunny Extra
Chimera - Angel of Death
Countdown: Akira
D4 Princess
Mermaid Melody Pichi Pichi Pitch series
Dirty Pair OVA series
Dirty Pair Flash
Magic Knight Rayearth series
Steel Angel Kurumi series
Zettai Shōnen
AD Police
Agent Aika
Burn Up!
New Angel
Kodocha (OVA)
Nontan
Mob Psycho 100
Parade Parade
Plastic Little
Perverted Thomas
Ronin Warriors
Platinumhuen Ordian
The Rapeman
Darling
Otaku no Video
Silent Möbius
Show Ahozoshi Akanuke Ichiban!
Scramble Wars
Steins;Gate
Dual Parallel Trouble Adventure
Edokko Boy: Gatten Taro
Exper Zenon
FAKE
Hanaukyo Maid-tai
Kekko Kamen
Level-C
G-On Riders
Oshare Majo: Love and Berry
Masquerade (OVA)
Ballad of a Shinigami
Yu-Gi-Oh! 5D's
Yu-Gi-Oh! Arc-V
Norakuro-kun
801 T.T.S. Airbats
Key the Metal Idol
Master of Martial Hearts
Welcome to Lodoss Island!
Kowarekake no Orgel
Robot Carnival
Kizuna: Bonds of Love
Ronin Warriors
Moeyo Ken
Usagi-chan de Cue!!
Bubblegum Crash
801 T.T.S. Airbats
Anoko ni 1000%
Demon Hunter Makaryuudo
X-Men

Toru Noguchi

Idol Angel Yokoso Yoko
Jankenman
Floral Magician Mary Bell
Shimajiro series (w/Daisuke Jinbo)
Tomato-Man and the Knights of the Salad Table
Final Fantasy: Unlimited
The Family's Defensive Alliance
Fancy Lala
Fushigi Yuugi series
Neon Genesis Evangelion series
Mermaid Melody Pichi Pichi Pitch series
Jin-Roh
Ask Dr. Rin!
Ashita e Free Kick
Akachan to Boku
Android Kikaider
A Letter to Momo
The Big O 
The Big O (first season)
The Cat Returns
Hikari no Densetsu
Yu-Gi-Oh! Duel Monsters
Yu-Gi-Oh! Duel Monsters GX
Magical Hat
Magic Knight Rayearth series
Mega Man: Upon a Star
Nadia: The Secret of Blue Water
Casshern Sins
Code:Breaker
The Legend of Zorro
Irresponsible Captain Tylor
Kare Kano
Neon Genesis Evangelion
Black Bullet
Zillion
Japan Animator Expo
Casshern Sins
Hyouge Mono
Hyper Police
Sonic Soldier Borgman
Tailenders
Shin Godzilla
Yoroshiku Mechadock
Aoi Kioku - Manmou Kaitaku to Shounen-tachi
Antique Heart
Kūsō no Sora Tobu Kikaitachi
Spirited Away (w/Michihiro Ito)
Howl's Moving Castle
Kusoh no Kikai-tachi no Naka no Hakai no Hatsumei

Rie Komiya

Death Note (anime version)
House of Five Leaves
Yu Yu Hakusho series
Chiisana Kyōjin Microman: Daigekisen! Microman VS Saikyō Senshi Gorgon 
YAT Anshin! Uchū Ryokō
Kiba
Ronin Warriors
Fushigi Yuugi (OVA 3)
Mermaid Melody Pichi Pichi Pitch series
Nagasarete Airantou
Onegai My Melody series
Hamtaro series
Ultra Maniac
Mirmo!
Jewelpet
Dotto! Koni-chan
Shizuku-chan
The Place Promised in Our Early Days
Akubi-chan series
In This Corner of the World
Cinderella

Anime companies
Mass media companies established in 1976
1976 establishments in Japan